Lépinas is a commune in the Creuse department in the Nouvelle-Aquitaine region in central France.

Geography
The river Gartempe flows through the middle of the commune.

Population

Sights
 The church, dating from the twelfth century.
 The lake of La Chapelle

See also
Communes of the Creuse department

References

Communes of Creuse